Achit Shigwan (born 6 October 1995) is an Indian cricketer. He made his Twenty20 debut for Goa in the 2017–18 Zonal T20 League on 8 January 2018.

References

External links
 

1995 births
Living people
Indian cricketers
Goa cricketers
Place of birth missing (living people)